Miron Chichişan (April 25, 1945 – January 31, 2016) was a Romanian politician. He served as the Mayor of Zalău and as a member of the Chamber of Deputies of Romania.

References

External links
  Adevărul, Miron Chichişan: „Îmi venea să mă omor, dar nu ştiam cum”

1945 births
Romanian National Unity Party politicians
2016 deaths
People from Sălaj County
Mayors of places in Romania
People from Zalău
Members of the Chamber of Deputies (Romania)
Technical University of Cluj-Napoca alumni